Justin Hoh Shou Wei (born 1 April 2004) is a Malaysian badminton player. Hoh was ranked first in BWF World Junior Ranking in both boys' singles and boys' doubles on 1 April 2022.

Early life 
Hoh was born in Kuala Lumpur. He started playing badminton at the age of seven.

Career

2019 
On December 15 2019, Hoh won Badminton Asia U-17 Junior Championships or known as Asian Youth Badminton Championships beating Jason Gunawan from Hong Kong in the Boys' Singles U-17 final. Just one week after, he won Men's Doubles U-19 title in Bangladesh Junior International Series with his partner Muhammad Fazriq Mohammad Razif beating compatriot Eon Eogene Ewe & Ong Zhen Yi in the final.

2021 
After more than one year not competing internationally due to pandemic, on October 31 2021 Hoh made a comeback on Finnish Junior where he won Men's Doubles U-19 title with his partner Ong Zhen Yi, beating compatriot Muhammad Fazriq Mohammad Razif & Wong Vin Sean in All Malaysian Final.

2022
On May 30, 2022, Hoh won the National Under-21 championships for the first time after beating Chia Jeng Hon. He won his first senior title in Bonn International after beating Su Li Yang in the final. He then proceeded to win his second senior title in the next week at Croatia Open, after defeating Nguyen Hai Dang from Vietnam in 80 minutes. On August 28, he won his third international title for the season at the India Junior International Series after defeating his opponent, Pranay Shettigar from India. Hoh was promoted to senior ranks in November 2022.

Achievements

BWF International Challenge/Series (4 titles, 1 runner-up) 
Men's singles

  BWF International Challenge tournament
  BWF International Series tournament
  BWF Future Series tournament

BWF Junior International (3 titles, 1 runner-up) 
Boys' singles

Boys' doubles

  BWF Junior International Grand Prix tournament
  BWF Junior International Challenge tournament
  BWF Junior International Series tournament
  BWF Junior Future Series tournament

References

External links
 

2004 births
Living people
People from Kuala Lumpur
Malaysian male badminton players
Malaysian sportspeople of Chinese descent
21st-century Malaysian people